Autódromo Brasília BRB is a racing circuit in Brasília, the capital of Brazil. The track was initially opened in 1974, and hosted non-championship rounds for both Formula One and the BPR Global GT Series, and in recent years was scheduled to host both MotoGP and IndyCar, but due to costs and construction delays, neither event went ahead. Previously named Autódromo Emilio Medici and Autódromo de Brasília, the circuit's name was later changed to honor Formula 1 World Champion Nelson Piquet. Following the transfer of ownership from Terracap to Banco de Brasília (BRB), the track is currently named Autódromo Brasília BRB.

Location

The circuit is located in Brasilia, which is located in the Federal District, in Brazil. It is located across the road from Brasilia's Estádio Nacional, which was a venue of the 2014 FIFA World Cup. Both venues are part of the Ayrton Senna Sports Complex.

History

Early history 
The circuit opened in 1974, named Autódromo Emilio Medici after the country's president at the time, and was built to provide a permanent home for motor racing in the relatively new city of Brasilia. Prior to this, races had been held on temporary street circuits in the city, although it was determined that a permanent circuit would be necessary to attract major events such as Formula One. Construction had begun in 1972 and took two years to complete, with the circuit being designed by engineer Samuel Dias.

To celebrate the circuit's opening, a non-championship Formula One race, the Grande Premio Presidente Emilio Medici, was held on 3 February 1974, one week after the official Brazilian Grand Prix. Around 85,000 spectators attended the event, which was competed between just 12 cars, with local driver Emerson Fittipaldi claiming victory. Following Emilio Medici's succession in the 1974 presidential election, the circuit was renamed to Autódromo de Brasília and continued to host a variety of national-level series for the following two decades.

Nelson Piquet ownership (1995–2006) 
From 1995, the circuit was leased to NZ Empreendimentos, owned by Nelson Piquet, by the Government of the Federal District. Following this. the circuit underwent refurbishment, involving the installation of gravel traps, tyre barriers and lighting in order to bring the venue up to modern safety standards and allow it host international events again. In 1996, the circuit hosted a non-championship promotional race of the BPR Global GT Series. The event, held on 16 December 1996, was called the 2 Hours of Brasilia and was won by the BMW Motorsport entry consisting of Nelson Piquet and Johnny Cecotto. The event had been run in tandem with another promotional race held in Brazil, the 2 Hours Curitiba, which was held the weekend before the race in Brasilia. The following year the BPR Global GT Series became the FIA GT Championship, and the Brazilian races ultimately proved to be a one-off. There was discussion in 1997 about the possibility of Formula 1 returning to the circuit, with a proposal initiated by Nelson Piquet to move the Brazilian Grand Prix from Interlagos to Brasilia from 1999 onwards, but this proposal was short-lived. In 2006, the Federal District regained management of the circuit due to NZ Empreendimentos' lack of attention to the track's management.

Refurbishment attempts (2006–2021) 
On 19 August 2013 it was announced that the circuit would host a round of the MotoGP World Championship from the 2014 season onward, with the inaugural event scheduled for 28 September. In preparation for the series' return, major upgrades were planned for the circuit's facilities and the circuit itself was to receive a substantial reconfiguration in order to make it safer and suitable for hosting international events. However, the event organizers were unable to secure funding to the complete the work in time and the event was removed from the final calendar on 24 February 2014. 
 
Another major announcement came on 18 September 2014, when it was confirmed that the circuit would host the opening round of the 2015 Indycar Series on March 8. Work to upgrade the circuit was resumed, using a combination of private funds and backing from the Government of the Federal District. The proposed circuit reconfiguration was less ambitious than that proposed for the MotoGP return, with the general layout retained and work mostly consisting of reprofiling corners, adding chicanes and relocating the pit lane. In January 2015 it was decided that, due to a lack of funding, the changes would be scaled back, with the pit lane remaining in its existing location, and just four corners being modified. However, on 29 January 2015, it was announced that the race had been cancelled as the newly elected district government deemed the event to be a waste of public funds, in the midst of a growing financial crisis for the district. This came as a shock, even to the event promoters, as more than two-thirds of the tickets had already been sold and a title sponsor had been acquired just one day prior to the cancellation. Following the announcement, construction work was halted with the circuit left in its half-finished state. The district governor initially committed to having the work complete by 26 April, so the circuit could host its scheduled round of the Stock Car Brasil series, however the event has now been rescheduled to September due to delays with construction works.

BRB ownership (2022–present) 
After the lack of progress with construction and restructuring, on 13 May 2022, Banco de Brasília (BRB) signed an agreement with the Government of the Federal District, that transferred ownership of the circuit and its facilities from previous owners Terracap. The deal also entails a R$60 million investment for the circuit's refurbishment. Following the announcement, the track was announced to host rounds of the Stock Car Brasil, Stock Series, and F4 Brazil championships.

Lap records

The official fastest lap records at the Autódromo Internacional Nelson Piquet (Brasília) are listed as:

Events

Current 

 November: Stock Car Brasil, F4 Brazil.
 December: TCR South America.

Former 

 Formula One Grande Prêmio Presidente Emilio Medici (1974, non-championship race)
 F3 Sudamericana (1988, 1990-1993, 1995-2011, 2013)
 Fórmula Truck (2002-2014)
 Fórmula 3 Brasil (2014)
 GT3 Brasil (2008)
 Mil Milhas Brasil (1997)

Notes

References

External links
 Satellite picture by Google Maps
 Trackpedia guide to driving Autódromo Internacional Nelson Piquet
 Autódromo Internacional Nelson Piquet Official Website

Brasilia
Sports venues in Brasília